The Southwestern Native Aquatic Resources and Recovery Center, formerly known as Dexter National Fish Hatchery & Technology Center, is a U.S. Fish and Wildlife Service facility dedicated to fish culture techniques for threatened and endangered fishes of the American Southwest. Located in Dexter, New Mexico, it is the only federal facility in the nation dedicated to studying and holding only threatened and endangered fish. Scientists at the Dexter facility perform life history studies and carefully analyze fish genetics while maintaining a refuge for 16 imperiled fish species.
Dexter National Fish Hatchery was established in 1931, to satisfy demands for game fish throughout the Southwest. New laws brought changes to the hatchery in the 1970s.

Fish species 
In 2021, the Southwestern Native Aquatic Resources and Recovery Center held 14 warmwater fish species. Five of those are their main species, with the rest only spawning intermittently or being maintained as refuge populations.
Bonytail chub (Gila elegans)
Colorado pikeminnow (Ptychocheilus lucius)
Rio Grande Minnow (Hybognathus amarus)
Razorback sucker (Xyrauchen texanus)
Woundfin (Plagopterus argentissimus)

The station maintains a genetically diverse broodstock for each species. Fish are raised from these broodstocks with the intent of reintroducing them into their native habitat.

Close monitoring at the hatchery include developing propagation and culture techniques, conducting water quality data, diet and nutrition testing, life history studies, reproductive physiology and genetic management.

Genetics 
Dexter’s Conservation Genetics Laboratory is fully equipped for routine genetic analysis with modern equipment designed to generate genetic information from microsatellite markers, and DNA sequences. Dexter’s program of rearing threatened and endangered fish relies on this data to provide genetically appropriate fish for stocking, and to monitor the purity of 16 species of endangered fish that are held as refugium stocks.

Dexter’s future Conservation Genetics program includes the short-term goal of developing genetic baselines for all species cultured and maintained at Dexter. Genetic information will be used to develop strategies for ensuring that genetic diversity is maintained in captive stocks, and to avoid such pitfalls as domestication selection, or genetic drift.

Dexter’s long-term goals for the Conservation Genetics program is to use the laboratory to address genetic components of multi regional Recovery programs, and to aid in the accomplishment of the Southwest Regions Fisheries Program Strategic Plan goals. These objectives are attainable through the use of science and technology, by developing and applying genetic conservation principles to the management of species produced and maintained at Dexter, thereby increasing the success of resources conservation.

Spawning 

 

Traditionally, the spawning season at the Dexter National Fish Hatchery & Technology Center starts in March and ends in mid-June. The techniques the Center employs are induced spawning and natural spawning. Seventeen different species on the endangered and threatened list are spawned at the Center.

Broodfish from these species are purposely reared at the Center for spawning. Each year the Center will spawn over 350 pairs of the broodfish using the induced spawning method. These pairs will produce over 3.5 million eggs. This count does not include those that will spawn naturally in the earthen ponds. Fish from each spawn will be taken and held at the station for future broodstock, ensuring genetic diversity. Different pairs of each species are spawned each year, discouraging spawning of the same fish year after year.

The success the Center has experienced in spawning is evident in its distribution of the species into their natural habitat. Without this type of intervention the chances of these species being extinct would almost be certain.

Tagging/marking of fish 
Currently, the Center uses four different methods. These methods are used as an identification tool. Biologists both in the field and on-site are able to identify fish that are reared at a facility versus those that are wild:

- Calcien Marking: Immersion fluorescent marker that adheres to boney parts of the fish. The fins and cranium seem to be the most susceptible parts of the fish. When placed under blue light, the marked areas exhibit fluorescence.

- Visible Implant Elastomer (VIE): Colored fluorescent elastomer material is injected into tissue with a hypodermic syringe. The material then cures into a pliable, solid well-defined mark, which fluoresces under blue light.

- Passive Integrated Transponder (PIT): Small microchips (about the size of a grain of rice) that are injected with a hypodermic syringe and read with a hand-held scanner.

- Wire Tagging: The Mark IV Tagging device emits a small magnetic wire tag that is injected just below the surface skin in various locations on the fish. Tags are read using a hand-held wand detector.

External links
 Southwestern Native Aquatic Resources and Recovery Center

National Fish Hatcheries of the United States
Buildings and structures in Chaves County, New Mexico
Tourist attractions in Chaves County, New Mexico
Agricultural buildings and structures in New Mexico
1931 establishments in New Mexico